Her Big Night is a 1926 American silent comedy film directed by Melville W. Brown and written by Brown, Rex Taylor, and Nita O'Neil. It is based on the 1925 short story, Doubling for Lora, by Peggy Gaddis that was originally serialized in Breezy Stories magazine. The film stars Laura La Plante, Einar Hanson, and Zasu Pitts. The film was released on December 5, 1926 by Universal Pictures under their 'Jewel' banner.

Cast
Laura La Plante as Frances Norcross/Daphne Dix 
Einar Hanson as Johnny Young 
Zasu Pitts as Gladys Smith
Tully Marshall as J.Q. Adams, reporter
Lee Moran as Tom Barrett
Mack Swain as Myers
John Roche as Allan Dix
William Austin as Harold Crosby
Nat Carr as Mr. Harmon
Cissy Fitzgerald as Mrs. Harmon

Preservation
A copy of Her Big Night is housed at UCLA Film and Television Archive.

References

External links

Stills at silenthollywood.com

1926 films
Silent American comedy films
American silent feature films
American black-and-white films
Universal Pictures films
Films directed by Melville W. Brown
Surviving American silent films
1926 comedy films
1920s American films
1920s English-language films